"I Won't Let You Down" is a 2016 single by Danish singer Christopher featuring American singer Bekuh Boom. The single topped Tracklisten, the official Danish Singles Chart, becoming Christopher's third number one on the chart after "Twerk It Like Miley" by Brandon Beal featuring Christopher and "CPH Girls" by Christopher featuring Brandon Beal. The song release on 1 April 2016.

Charts

Weekly charts

Year-end charts

References

2013 songs
Christopher (singer) songs
2013 singles
Warner Music Group singles
Parlophone singles